Tajikistan made its Paralympic Games début at the 2004 Summer Paralympics in Athens, with a single representative (Parviz Odinaev) in powerlifting. Competing in the men's up to 60 kg category, Odinaev lifted 147.5 kg, finishing 9th out of 16. In 2008, Tajikistan was again represented by a single powerlifter, this time a woman: Zaytuna Roziqova, in the up to 48 kg category. She failed to correctly lift any weight and record a mark.

Full results for Tajikistan at the Paralympics

See also
 Tajikistan at the Olympics

References

 
Paralympics